Robert Miln Neil (5 September 1882 – 14 September 1914) was a Scottish international rugby union player, who played for  and the Lions. He went to Edinburgh Academy and also played for Edinburgh Academicals. He was on the 1903 British Lions tour to South Africa. Gillespie was a chartered accountant by profession; he died in Kuala Lumpur, Malaya of appendicitis.

References
 Bath, Richard (ed.) The Scotland Rugby Miscellany (Vision Sports Publishing Ltd, 2007 )
 Godwin, Terry Complete Who's Who of International Rugby (Cassell, 1987)
 Massie, Allan A Portrait of Scottish Rugby (Polygon, Edinburgh)

1882 births
1914 deaths
20th-century Scottish businesspeople
British & Irish Lions rugby union players from Scotland
Deaths from appendicitis
Edinburgh Academicals rugby union players
People educated at Edinburgh Academy
Rugby union players from Edinburgh
Scotland international rugby union players
Scottish accountants
Scottish rugby union players